The Spanish reconquest of New Granada in 1815–1816 was part of the Spanish American wars of independence in South America. Shortly after the Napoleonic Wars ended, Ferdinand VII, recently restored to the throne in Spain, decided to send military forces to retake most of the northern South American colonies, which had established autonomous juntas and independent states. The invaders, with support from loyal colonial troops, completed the reconquest of New Granada by taking Bogotá on May 6, 1816.

The expeditionary force and campaigns
In 1815, Spain sent to its most seditious colonies the strongest expeditionary force that it had ever sent to the Americas. Colonel Pablo Morillo, a veteran of the Spanish struggle against the French, was chosen as its commander. The expeditionary force was made up of approximately 10,000 men and nearly 60 ships. Originally, they were to head for Montevideo in the Viceroyalty of the Río de la Plata, but soon it was decided to send these forces to the Viceroyalty of New Granada (present-day Colombia, Ecuador, Panama) and Venezuela.

Leaving the port of Cádiz on February 17, 1815, the force initially landed at Carupano and the island of Margarita in April, where no resistance was encountered. After leaving the island, Morillo's troops reinforced existing royalist forces in the Venezuelan mainland, entering Cumaná and Caracas in May. A small part of the main corps set off towards Panamá, while the main contingent was directed from Puerto Cabello towards the Neogranadine coastal city of Santa Marta which was still in royalist hands.

After picking up supplies and militia volunteers in Santa Marta on July 23, the Spanish expeditionary forces besieged Cartagena. After a five-month siege the fortified city fell on December 1815. By 1816, the combined efforts of Spanish and colonial forces, marching south from Cartagena and north from royalist strongholds in Quito, Pasto, and Popayán, completed the reconquest of New Granada, taking Bogotá on May 6, 1816. A permanent consejo de guerra was set up to judge those accused of treason and rebellion, resulting in the execution of more than a hundred notable republican officials, including Jorge Tadeo Lozano, Francisco José de Caldas and José María Cabal. Units of the republican armies of New Granada were incorporated into the royalist army and sent to Peru.

Patriot reactions
On learning of the arrival of the expeditionary force, republican leaders assumed various positions. Internal divisions, which had developed during the previous years of struggle, softened but still remained a considerable obstacle. In the end, they prevented a coordinated effort by the different factions, although there were some attempts to do so, such as under the United Provinces of New Granada. One significant factor in the disunity was that representatives of the United Kingdom and of the United States refused to grant political recognition and would not commit the sufficient amount of economic and military aid to successfully resist Morillo's force. In addition, the provinces themselves did not give each other much-needed aid. Finally, several notable individuals, whose leadership would have been useful, decided to exile themselves, although other republican leaders remained in the region and tried to reorganize their military and political activities in order to face the new threat.

As a result of the internal conflicts in New Granada, Simón Bolívar, who had been acting under the authority of the United Provinces, left his command on May 8, 1815, after failing to subdue Cartagena in March in retaliation for its refusal to give him arms and men. Bolívar traveled to Jamaica and later Haiti, a small republic that had freed itself from French rule, where he and other independence leaders were given a friendly reception. Eventually, the growing exile community received money, volunteers and weapons from Haitian president Alexandre Pétion, and resumed the struggle for independence in the remote border areas of both New Granada and Venezuela, where they established irregular guerrilla bands with the locals. This formed the basis from which the struggle to establish republics successfully spread towards the other areas of South America under Spanish control.

See also
Patria Boba
Reconquista (Spanish America)
Bolívar's campaign to liberate New Granada
History of Colombia

Bibliography
 Costeloe, Michael P. Response to Revolution: Imperial Spain and the Spanish American Revolutions, 1810-1840.  Cambridge: Cambridge University Press, 1986. 
 Earle, Rebecca. Spain and the Independence of Colombia, 1810-1825. Exter: University of Exter Press, 2000. 
 Stoan, Stephen K. Pablo Morillo and Venezuela, 1815-1820. Columbus: Ohio State University Press, 1959.

Viceroyalty of New Granada
Conflicts in 1815
Conflicts in 1816
Colonial Colombia
Colonial Venezuela
Independence of Colombia
Venezuelan War of Independence
Spanish American wars of independence
Military history of Colombia
Military history of Venezuela
Wars involving Colombia
Wars involving Spain
Wars involving Venezuela
1815 in Colombia
1816 in Colombia
1815 in Venezuela
1816 in Venezuela
1815 in the Viceroyalty of New Granada
1816 in the Viceroyalty of New Granada
Attacks in Venezuela